Chandika is a 1940 Telugu film directed by R. S. Prakash. Veteran actress P. Kannamba portrayed the role of Chandika.

Plot
Chandika (Kannamba) is the princess of a kingdom. She is unhappy with the ruling of King Giriraju (Gaggaiah). She wants to dethrone him and his husband prince to become the rajah. She has attracted the maharaja and kills him. During the encounter, she loses her husband. She could not control the Minister Veeramallu (Raghava), finally succumbs and commits suicide.

Cast
 Kannamba	 ... 	Chandika
 Vemuri Gaggaiah	 ... 	Giriraju
 Bellary Raghava	 ... 	Veeramallu
 T. Lalita Devi		
 Peddapuram Raju		
 Arani Satyanarayana		
 Puvvula Ratnamala
 Dasari Ramatilakam
 Puvvula Anasuya
 Puvvula Chandramouleeswara Rao
 M. Satyanarayana
 V. Venkata Subbarao
 Dasari Lakshmaiah Chowdary
 Master Viswam
 G. Seshagiri Rao

References

External links
 Chandika film at IMDb.

1940 films
1940s Telugu-language films
Indian black-and-white films
Indian action drama films
1940s action drama films
1940 drama films
Films directed by R. S. Prakash